Henry Lemaître Auger (1873–1948) was a Canadian politician and a two-term Member of the Legislative Assembly of Quebec.

Background

He was born in Massachusetts on May 2, 1873 and married Marie-Éva Héroux in Trois-Rivières, Mauricie in 1906.

City Councillor

He ran for a seat on the city council of Montreal in 1930 and won against incumbent Damase Généreux. He represented the district of Saint-Jacques. He was re-elected in 1932 and 1934. He resigned in 1936 to enter provincial politics.

Member of the legislature

Auger ran as a Conservative candidate in the provincial district of Montréal–Saint-Jacques in the 1935 election and won.

He joined Maurice Duplessis's Union Nationale and was re-elected in the 1936 election. He was appointed to the Cabinet and served as Minister of Colonization until he was defeated by the Liberal candidate Joseph-Roméo Toupin in the 1939 election.

Death

He died on June 10, 1948 in Montreal.

Footnotes

1873 births
1948 deaths
Montreal city councillors
Conservative Party of Quebec MNAs
Union Nationale (Quebec) MNAs
Burials at Notre Dame des Neiges Cemetery
American emigrants to Canada